Darkwitch Rising is the third book in the Troy Game series by Sara Douglass.

Plot summary

All of the players are back again, born in medieval London, and with more desire to finish the Troy Game once and for all. Brutus is reborn as Charles II of England, Coel as Louis de Silva, Matilda as Queen Catherine, Ecub as Marguerite, Cornelia as Noah Banks, Genvissa as Jane Orr and the hateful Asterion as Weyland Orr.

With Genvissa already in his hands with his imp inside her womb, all Weyland needs to do is wait for Noah to come to him as she must, with another imp inside her own womb. His plans are to force Jane to teach Noah the arts of Mistress of the Labyrinth, then dispose of Jane however he will. He runs his own whorehouse while he waits.

Charles, the rightful heir to the throne of England, is exiled to the Scilly Islands, but not entirely. Unbeknownst to all but his close circle of friends including Louis, Marguerite, and Kate, he has a small turf in England. Together, using this small piece of earth, they scry out Noah.

Noah makes love to Brutus as a 'healing of the wounds' and they conceive a 'daughter'. That daughter is named Catling--the Troy Game incarnate. As Catling grows in Noah's womb, she traps the imps into her power.

Later in the story, Noah Banks returns to Weyland through excruciating pain caused by the imp. At this stage in the story, Catling is already born. Unbeknownst to her, when she would have died, Weyland came and, unexpectedly, healed her back.

Through this pain caused by imps to the two rival women in the past, Jane and Noah both become sisters through shared pain.

Much later, Noah falls in love with Weyland and deserts Louis. She is a Darkwitch, the Goddess Eaving and also Mistress of the Labyrinth. Only she, Louis and Weyland combined have the power to finally exterminate the Troy Game once and for all.

But without Louis by their side, Noah and Weyland fail, and so the final part of the Troy Game is written: Druid's Sword.

Characters

Jane Orr
Genvissa reborn. In the earlier life, she was Swanne, wife to Harold. Jane is reborn as Asterion's younger sister, and, under his power, she becomes his whore in his whorehouse. She soon catches the pox and later falls in love with Coel, the Faerie King. She is killed by the Troy Game for betraying its true nature to Noah.
King Charles
Coel reborn. In the earlier life, he was Harold. He is King of England in this life, and mistaken by some players of the Troy Game to be Brutus. He also assumes the crown of the Faerie King.
Louis de Silva
Brutus reborn. In the earlier life he was William of Normandy. His name in this life literally means 'Louis of the forest' as he was born there, bastard son of the Marquis de Lonquefort and his mistress Helene. He is French and described as having 'poet's eyes'. He becomes the resurrected Ringwalker, the Stag God Og.
Noah Banks
Cornelia reborn. In the earlier life, she was Queen Caela of England. She is Eaving, Mag reborn and, in this book, trains to become the most powerful Mistress of the Labyrinth ever seen. It is later found out that she is a descendant of Ariadne and the Minotaur, Asterion. As it is, she falls in love with Asterion and becomes pregnant with their child, Grace.
Weyland Orr
Asterion reborn. He is the dreaded Minotaur that all the other players of the Game struggle against until Noah and he fell in love. Noah then suspects that the evil is not Asterion, but the Troy Game. He has a daughter called Grace.
James, Duke of York
Loth reborn. In his earlier life he was Saewald, physician of King Edward the Confessor. In this life he is King Charles's younger brother, a Christian who has renounced his pagan ways and upbringing from his first life as Loth.

Publication history

2005, AUS, Voyager , Pub date May 2005, Hardback
2006, AUS, Voyager , Pub date January 2006, Trade Paperback
2006, AUS, Voyager , Pub date 26 April 2006, Mass Market Paperback
2005, US, Tor Books , Pub date 21 April 2005, Hardback
2005, US, Tor Books , Pub date 27 December 2005, Paperback
2005, UK, Tor Books , Pub date July 2005, Hardback
2006, UK, Tor Books , Pub date 1 March 2006, Paperback

2005 Australian novels
2005 fantasy novels
Australian fantasy novels
Novels by Sara Douglass
Voyager Books books
Cultural depictions of Charles II of England
Cultural depictions of Catherine of Braganza
Cultural depictions of James II of England